Encounter is an album by Michael Stearns, released in 1988.

Subtitled A Journey in the Key of Space, it is a collection of instrumental pieces, weaving synthesizers and various background sounds. It evokes peaceful landscapes, feelings of a summer night, space and an encounter with a UFO.

Track listing 
 "Encounter: Awaiting the Other" – 3:29
 "Craft: Dimensional Release" – 6:29
 "The Beacon: Those Who Have Gone Before" – 7:01
 "On the Way: Space Caravan" – 3:48
 "Dimensional Shift: Across the Threshold" – 5:29
 "Within: Choir of the Ascending Spirit" – 3:53
 "Distant Thunder: Solitary Witness" – 5:40
 "Alien Shore: Starlight Bay" – 3:46
 "Procession: Sacred Ceremony" – 8:55
 "Star Dreams: Peace Eternal" – 4:06

References

External links 
 Hearts of Space Records (Record label's album page)

Hearts of Space Records albums
Michael Stearns albums
1988 albums
Space music albums by American artists